Lin Cheng-chih (born 17 February 1939) or Helen Lin is a Taiwanese politician.

Personal life
Lin Cheng-chih is the daughter-in-law of Hsieh Tung-min, and is also known by the English name Helen Lin.

Career
Lin attended the Shih Chien College of Home Economics and served as the institution's president. She also worked within the Kuomintang Department of Women’s Affairs. On 10 June 1996, she was appointed minister of the Council of Cultural Affairs. She cancelled a visit to China when the 1999 Jiji earthquake hit Taiwan, and began planning renovations to a number of cultural sites damaged by the quake. Lin was succeeded at the Council for Cultural Affairs by Tchen Yu-chiou in May 2000, when the Chen Shui-bian presidential administration took office. 

Lien Chan appointed Helen Lin vice chair of the Kuomintang in June 2000. She became the first woman to take the position. In April 2001, the Kuomintang nominated Lin for an open position on a committee convened to oversee Public Television Service. Following the first direct election for Kuomintang leadership in July 2001, Lin was retained as a vice chair of the party. During the 2003 SARS outbreak, Lin led the Kuomintang's epidemic prevention task force. Lin retained her post as a vice chairwoman when Ma Ying-jeou was elected Kuomintang chairman in 2005. In 2006, she co-chaired a Kuomintang committee to vet candidates for the Control Yuan.

References

1939 births
Living people
Taiwanese Ministers of Culture
Women government ministers of Taiwan
Kuomintang politicians in Taiwan
Presidents of universities and colleges in Taiwan
Women heads of universities and colleges
Shih Chien University alumni
Academic staff of Shih Chien University
20th-century Taiwanese politicians
21st-century Taiwanese politicians